Dichomeris balioella is a moth in the family Gelechiidae. It was described by Ponomarenko and Ueda in 2004. It is found in Thailand.

The forewings are yellowish grey with irregular short dark brown transverse streaks, formed by scattered scales. The costal margin is dark brown in the basal one-seventh and with nine to ten dark brown short costal marks and small spots. There are six dark brown dots along the apex and termen. The hindwings are brownish grey, but darker distally.

Etymology
The species name is derived from Greek bali- (meaning the spotted).

References

Moths described in 2004
balioella